= Adad Banda =

- Location within Pakistan
- Coordinates: 34.91°N 71.57°E
- Country: Pakistan
- Territory: Federally Administered Tribal Areas
- Elevation: 1,468 m (4,816 ft)
- Time zone: UTC+5 (PST)
  - Summer (DST): UTC+6 (PDT)

Adad Banda is a town in the Federally Administered Tribal Areas of Pakistan. It is located at 34°54'42N 71°34'18E with an altitude of 1,468 metres (4,819 feet).
